Mickaël Rol (born 30 October 1976) is a former professional footballer who played as a defender or defensive midfielder.

Post-playing career
After his retirement from playing, Rol ended up working for Danone.

References

External links
 
 
 
 Mickaël Rol profile at chamoisfc79.fr

1976 births
Living people
French footballers
Association football defenders
Association football midfielders
Olympique Lyonnais players
OGC Nice players
Chamois Niortais F.C. players
AS Cherbourg Football players
Ligue 2 players
Thonon Evian Grand Genève F.C. players
Montluçon Football players